Brave is an action-adventure adaptation based on the 2012 film of the same name developed by Behaviour Interactive and published by Disney Interactive Studios. Actress Kelly Macdonald, who voiced Merida in the film, reprised her role for the video game.

Story
The storyline of the video game matches that of the film up until Elinor's transformation into a bear and subsequent escape from the castle, which is where the game begins.

Merida chases her mother through the forest until she reaches the Ring of Stones. Will-o'-the-wisps appear to guide her to the cottage of the witch from whom she originally received the spell. Confronting the witch, Merida demands her mother be changed back. The witch explains that the cursed bear Mor'du has been corrupting a series of waystones with his evil energy, leading to the appearance of hostile creatures. The corruption has grown to the point that it even affects the witch's magic, making its effects unpredictable, thus explaining Elinor's newly-ursine form. Due to her status as the best archer in the kingdom, the witch charges Merida with cleansing the waystones of Mor'du's corruption.

As Merida journeys through the land, she encounters her younger identical triplet brothers (Harris, Hubert, and Hamish), also transformed into bears, and her mother, gradually losing her humanity as the spell stays in effect. After cleansing the last waystone in Mor'du's lair, Merida and her mother come face-to-face with the beast himself, with the princess finally defeating him after a long and arduous battle.

With Mor'du's defeat, Elinor and the triplets are restored to their human forms. Merida states that the journey was good for her because it taught her that she must strike a balance between her desire for adventure and her responsibilities as a princess.

Gameplay
The gameplay consists of single player and local co-operative play. The first player controls Mérida while in co-op mode a second player can take control of a will-o'-the-wisp. Gameplay also features puzzles, which are to be solved with the help of the triplets, and Queen Elinor, who is playable in her bear form in arena fights. Different levels of the game can be accessed from the location called "Ring of Stones". Players can use different types of charms (fire, earth, air, and ice) to add elemental effects to her arrows and sword attacks when fighting enemies, some of which are vulnerable to a certain element.

The PlayStation 3 and Xbox 360 versions of the game are compatible with the PlayStation Move and Kinect motion control peripherals, respectively. This feature comes in the form of an "archery range" mode.

Reception

The game received mixed reviews from critics who praised the gameplay and style but criticized the kinect mode (for the 360 version).

References

External links
Official site

2012 video games
Action-adventure games
Disney video games
Fantasy video games
Kinect games
MacOS games
Nintendo DS games
Video games based on films
PlayStation 3 games
PlayStation Move-compatible games
Video games featuring female protagonists
Wii games
Windows games
Xbox 360 games
Multiplayer and single-player video games
Video games about bears
Video games about shapeshifting
Video games set in the Middle Ages
Video games set in Scotland
Behaviour Interactive games
Brave (2012 film)
Video games developed in Canada
3D platform games